Princess Louise-Marie may refer to:

 Louisa Maria Teresa Stuart (1682-1712), known in French as Louise Marie
 Princess Louise-Marie of Belgium (1858-1924), eldest daughter of King Leopold II of Belgium and Marie Henriette of Austria
 Princess Louise-Marie of France (1737-1787), Carmelite nun

See also

 Louise-Marie
 Princess Louise (disambiguation)
 Princess Marie (disambiguation)